The Goose River is a river of The Bahamas. While there are many tidal creeks in The Bahamas, the Goose River is the only river.

See also
 List of creeks of The Bahamas

References

Rivers of the Bahamas